The 2014 Espirito Santo Trophy took place 2–7 September at the Karuizawa 72 Golf East, on its Iriyama and Oshitate courses in Karuizawa, Japan. 

It was the 26th women's golf World Amateur Team Championship for the Espirito Santo Trophy.

The tournament was a 72-hole stroke play team event. There were 50 team entries, each with two or three players.

Each team played two rounds at the Iriyama Course and two rounds at the Oshitate Course. The leading teams played the fourth round at Iriyama. The best two scores for each round counted towards the team total.

Team Australia won their third title, with a 29-under-par score of 547, two strokes ahead of silver medalist team Canada. Defending champions, team South Korea, took the bronze medal on third place one more stroke back.

The individual title went to 16-year-old Brooke Henderson, Canada, whose score of 19-under-par 269 was a championship record and three strokes ahead of Minjee Lee, Australia on second place.

Teams 
50 teams entered the event and completed the competition. Each team had three players, except three teams. The teams representing Bolivia, Gabon and Serbia only had two players each.

Results 

Source:

Individual leaders 
There was no official recognition for the lowest individual scores.

References

External links
Coverage on International Golf Federation website

Espirito Santo Trophy
Golf tournaments in Japan
Sport in Nagano Prefecture
Espirito Santo Trophy
Espirito Santo Trophy
Espirito Santo Trophy